Zahoor Elahi (born 1 March 1971) is a Pakistani cricketer who played in two Test matches and 14 One Day Internationals between 1996 and 1997. His debut was against Zimbabwe. His brothers Manzoor and Saleem were also cricketers.

References

1971 births
Living people
Pakistan Test cricketers
Pakistan One Day International cricketers
Punjabi people
Pakistani cricketers
Multan cricketers
Pakistan Automobiles Corporation cricketers
House Building Finance Corporation cricketers
Lahore City cricketers
Lahore Whites cricketers
Dhaka Metropolis cricketers
Faisalabad cricketers
Zarai Taraqiati Bank Limited cricketers
Sui Northern Gas Pipelines Limited cricketers
Pakistan Customs cricketers
Khan Research Laboratories cricketers
Cricketers from Sahiwal
Pakistani cricket coaches